John Clemence Gordon Brown is a former Canadian retired diplomat. He was appointed Ambassador Extraordinary and Plenipotentiary to the Democratic Republic of Congo, followed by Zaire then as High Commissioner to Zambia and as Ambassador Extraordinary and Plenipotentiary to Rwanda then as High Commissioner to Cyprus.

External links 
 Foreign Affairs and International Trade Canada Complete List of Posts

Year of birth missing (living people)
Living people
High Commissioners of Canada to Zambia
High Commissioners of Canada to Cyprus
Ambassadors of Canada to Rwanda
Ambassadors of Canada to the Democratic Republic of the Congo